In demonology, Furcas (also spelled Forcas) is a Knight of Hell (the rank of Knight is unique to him), and rules 20 legions of demons. He teaches Philosophy, Astronomy (Astrology to some authors), Rhetoric, Logic, Chiromancy and Pyromancy.
 
Furcas (also known as Ren Vacca) is depicted as a strong old man with white hair and long white beard, who rides a horse while holding a sharp weapon (pitch fork).

The etymology of his name may be derived from the Latin word furca, meaning  fork, or from Greco-Roman also meaning a sepulchre (tomb).

References

Sources
S. L. MacGregor Mathers, A. Crowley, The Goetia: The Lesser Key of Solomon the King (1904). 1995 reprint: .

Goetic demons